Elvis Konamegui (born 6 June 1973) is a Cameroonian boxer. He competed in the men's featherweight event at the 1996 Summer Olympics.

References

1973 births
Living people
Cameroonian male boxers
Olympic boxers of Cameroon
Boxers at the 1996 Summer Olympics
Place of birth missing (living people)
Featherweight boxers